Alan Anton (1 January 1933 – 31 January 1994) was a former Australian rules footballer who played for the Fitzroy Football Club in the Victorian Football League (VFL).

Notes

External links 
		

1933 births
1994 deaths
Australian rules footballers from Victoria (Australia)
Fitzroy Football Club players
Traralgon Football Club players